Vanina Paula Oneto (born June 15, 1973, in San Fernando) is a retired field hockey player from Argentina, who won the silver medal at the 2000 Summer Olympics in Sydney and the bronze medal at the 2004 Summer Olympics in Athens with the National field hockey team. Vanina also won the 2002 World Cup, the 2001 Champions Trophy, three Pan American Games and the Pan American Cup in 2001.

References
  sports-reference

External links
 

1973 births
Living people
Argentine people of Italian descent
Argentine female field hockey players
Las Leonas players
Olympic field hockey players of Argentina
Field hockey players at the 1996 Summer Olympics
Field hockey players at the 2000 Summer Olympics
Medalists at the 2000 Summer Olympics
Field hockey players at the 2004 Summer Olympics
Medalists at the 2004 Summer Olympics
Olympic silver medalists for Argentina
Olympic bronze medalists for Argentina
Olympic medalists in field hockey
Pan American Games gold medalists for Argentina
People from San Fernando de la Buena Vista
Pan American Games medalists in field hockey
Place of birth missing (living people)
Field hockey players at the 1991 Pan American Games
Field hockey players at the 1995 Pan American Games
Field hockey players at the 1999 Pan American Games
Medalists at the 1995 Pan American Games
Medalists at the 1991 Pan American Games
Medalists at the 1999 Pan American Games
Sportspeople from Buenos Aires Province